Eupithecia maloti is a moth in the  family Geometridae. It is found in Lesotho and South Africa.

References

Moths described in 2000
maloti
Moths of Africa